Lahera is a surname. Notable people with the surname include:

Miguel Lahera (born 1985), Cuban baseball player
Yaudel Lahera (born 1992), Cuban footballer